Oskar Lindstedt (born July 16, 1993) is a Swedish ice hockey defenceman. He is currently playing with AIK IF in the Elitserien.

References

External links

1993 births
AIK IF players
Living people
Swedish ice hockey defencemen
Ice hockey people from Stockholm